Living Buddhas (German: Lebende Buddhas) is a 1925 German silent film in five chapters, directed by Paul Wegener and starring Wegener, Asta Nielsen and Käthe Haack. It was co-written by Wegener and Hans Stürm (who played Professor Campbell in the film). Wegener cast himself as the evil High Llama of a devil cult. Danish actress Nielsen's film career went downhill quickly with the advent of sound films. It was made at the Staaken Studios in Berlin. Only five minutes of footage survive of the original 139-minute running time.

Plot
Professor Campbell and his young wife travel to Tibet on an expedition to investigate a primitive and savage cult. The high priest of the cult plans to use Mrs. Campbell as a human sacrifice. The professor succeeds in getting the entire party out of Tibet, and even manages to bring with him a sacred document belonging to the cult. Once back in Europe, he tries to decipher the parchment, but the cult members have followed him home.

Cast
Paul Wegener as Großlama (the High Llama)  
Asta Nielsen as Tibetanerin  
Käthe Haack as Frau Campbell  
Gregori Chmara as Jebsun  
Carl Ebert as Professor Smith  
Friedrich Kühne as 1. Lama  
Max Pohl as 2. Lama 
Heinrich Schroth as Dr. Smith  
Hans Stürm as Professor Campbell  
Eduard Rothauser

References

External links

Films of the Weimar Republic
Films directed by Paul Wegener
German silent feature films
Films about Tibet
Films shot at Staaken Studios
German black-and-white films
Terra Film films